8 Field Regiment  is an artillery regiment which is part of the Regiment of Artillery of the Indian Army.

Initial establishment 
The regiment was raised on November 1, 1941 at Secunderabad as 3rd Anti Tank Regiment by Lt Col J.H.H. Willans, RA.  The class composition was Ahirs and Punjabi Muslims.

History 
In 1942, during World War II, the regiment was deployed in Colombo as part of the 34 Infantry Division in Ceylon Garrison.
In 1945, the Regiment returned to India and was reorganised as the 8 Field Regiment with pure class composition of Ahirs.  The batteries composed of Punjabi Muslims moved to Pakistan.
Lt Col KS Sandhu was the first Indian Commanding Officer. During the victory parade held in London in 1946, the Regiment was represented by its first Ahir Subedar Major Shib Sahai, Sardar Bahadur, OBI and three Other ranks.

Operations 
Some of the major operations undertaken by the Regiment include:
Partition of India During the partition, the Regiment helped evacuate around 210 thousand refugees, while deployed in Mianwali and Rawalpindi areas of Pakistan.
Indo-Pakistani War of 1947–1948 The Regiment was supporting an Infantry Division in capturing two important heights in Naushera sector of Jammu and Kashmir.
Indo-Pakistani War of 1971 The Regiment took part in the Western Front in the Shakargarh sector.

See also
List of artillery regiments of Indian Army

References 

Military units and formations established in 1941
British Indian Army regiments
Artillery regiments of the Indian Army after 1947